Dennis Gamsy (born 17 February 1940 in Glenwood, Natal) is a former South African cricketer who played in two Tests as a wicketkeeper in 1970 against Australia.

He played for Natal from 1958–59 to 1972–73, and toured England with the South African team in 1965. In 1970 he became one of the first prominent South African cricketers to speak out in favour of mixed-race sport in South Africa. Shortly afterwards he founded the Cricket Club of South Africa, one of the country's first multi-racial teams.

See also
List of select Jewish cricketers

References

External links
 Dennis Gamsy at Cricket Archive
 Dennis Gamsy at Cricinfo

1940 births
Living people
Jewish South African sportspeople
South Africa Test cricketers
South African cricketers
KwaZulu-Natal cricketers
South African Universities cricketers
International Cavaliers cricketers
Jewish cricketers
Wicket-keepers